Badu is a surname. In Nepal, the surname बडू is found in the Brahmin community in the far western region, mainly in the Darchula, doti  and Baitadi districts. An unrelated surname is found in Ghana.

Notable people with the surname include:

 Alfred Badu, French equestrian who competed at the 1920 Olympics
Awurama Badu (1945–2017), Ghanaian highlife musician
Bastian Badu (born 2000), French footballer
Benjamin Agyeman-Badu (born 1998), British-Ghanaian footballer
Dilendra Prasad Badu (born 1954), Nepalese politician
Emmanuel Agyemang-Badu (born 1990), Ghanaian footballer
 Erykah Badu (professional name of Erica Abi Wright, born 1971), American singer/songwriter, record producer, and actress
Kofi Badu, 20th-century Ghanaian newspaper editor, politician and government minister
 Malcolm Badu (born 1997), German footballer
 Bhumi Raj Badu , Politician of Nepali congress 

Yaa Ntiamoah Badu, Ghanaian zoologist, environmental specialist, academic and management expert

See also 

 Antonio Badú

Ghanaian surnames